Rauf Yekta Bey (27 March 1871 – 8 January 1935) was a Turkish musician, musicologist and writer on music.

Biography
Rauf Yekta was born on 27 March 1871, in the Aksaray area of Istanbul, Turkey to his father Ahmed Arif Bey.  He was named Mehmed Rauf but adopted Rauf Yekta as a pen name.
Rauf Yekta spoke 3 languages:  French, Arabic and Persian.  He was a government official.
Zeliha Han married Rauf Yekta Bey and they had two sons and two daughters.

Contribution to the theory of Turkish classical music

Yekta wrote the first modern account of Turkish classical music available in a Western language (Raouf Yekta Bey, "La musique turque", in Encyclopedie de la musique et dictionnaire du Conservatoire, edited by Albert Lavignac, Première partie, Volume V, pp. 2945–3064. Paris, 1922). His emphasis in this encyclopedia article was on intervals, modes and rhythms, quoting some 73 musical examples.  

In the article he introduced a modified European notation.  Yekta's system used a variety of accidentals to express the microtonal inflections necessary for the Turkish modal system.  This notational system was the one used for the official publications of the Istanbul Conservatory during the 1920s and 1930s.

The present-day theory of Turkish classical music is the result of collaboration by Yekta with Dr. Suphi Ezgi (1869–1962) and H. Sadettin Arel (1880–1955).

Career as a performer

Yekta performed often at Mevlevi ceremonies.

Notes

References
 Turkmusikisi.com – Biography of Rauf Yekta Bey 

Turkish musicologists
Musicians from Istanbul
1871 births
1935 deaths
Writers from Istanbul
Composers of Ottoman classical music
Composers of Turkish makam music
Writers about music